The 1950–51 Chicago Black Hawks season was the team's 25th season in the NHL, and they were coming off of a last place finish in 1949–50, as the Hawks had a record of 22–38–10, earning 54 points, and failing to qualify for the post-season for the fourth season in a row. In 1950–51, the Black Hawks would have one of the worst seasons in their history, winning only 13 games.

Off-season
In the off-season, the Black Hawks and Detroit Red Wings made the biggest trade in NHL history at the time, as Chicago sent Jim Henry, Gaye Stewart, Bob Goldham and Metro Prystai to Detroit for Harry Lumley, Jack Stewart, Al Dewsbury, Don Morrison and Pete Babando.  The club also replaced head coach Charlie Conacher with former Red Wings player Ebbie Goodfellow, and named the newly acquired Jack Stewart the captain of the team.

Regular season
Chicago started the season off playing very good hockey, as they went a solid 7–3–2 in their opening 12 games.  The Black Hawks then fell into a slump, however, 27 games into the season, they were still playing over .500 hockey, as their record was 11–10–6, and fighting with the New York Rangers, Boston Bruins and Montreal Canadiens for a playoff spot.  Chicago then ran into injuries, as team captain Jack Stewart ruptured a disc in his back, ending his season after only 26 games, while Gus Bodnar and Bill Gadsby would also run into severe injury problems, as the Black Hawks would go on to a 2–37–4 record in their last 43 games, finishing in last place for the second consecutive season.  The 36 points the Hawks earned was the lowest total since 1944–45, when the team earned 33, however, they played 20 less games that season.

Offensively, Chicago was led by Roy Conacher, who notched a team high 26 goals and 50 points, while Jim Conacher recorded a team high 27 assists, and finished tied with Pete Babando in second place on the team scoring list with 37 points.  Bill Mosienko would join Roy Conacher as the only Hawks to record over 20 goals, as he registered 21 goals.  Al Dewsbury led the blueline with 5 goals and 19 points, and had a club high 79 penalty minutes.

In goal, newly acquired Harry Lumley played the majority of the games, winning a team high 12 games while posting a team best 3.90 GAA, while earning three shutouts along the way.

Season standings

Teams in bold qualified for the playoffs.

Record vs. opponents

Schedule and results

Regular season

Player statistics

Scoring leaders

Goaltending

References

 Hockey-Reference
 National Hockey League Guide & Record Book 2007

Chicago Blackhawks seasons
Chicago Black Hawks season, 1950-51
Chicago